Jatinegara Station (JNG) is a large type A-class railway station located on the border between Jatinegara and Matraman in Pisangan Baru Subdistrict, Matraman, East Jakarta. The station is the main entrance to Jakarta from cities east of Jakarta. Jatinegara station is operated by Kereta Api Indonesia and Kereta Commuter Indonesia.

All but a few intercity trains originating from cities east of Jakarta stop at Jatinegara; however, all trains heading to those cities pass the station. The government is planning to make the station into a terminus for some of these trains.

History

Before the construction of the station, the area where the current building stood was known as swamp named "Rawa Bangke". Then the region was renamed to Meester Cornelis. The name was adopted from the calling of the students to a teacher who taught, founded a school, and preached in the area, namely Cornelis Senen. The name was later changed to Jatinegara during the Japanese occupation because the Japanese did not want a Dutch term. The name Jatinegara means "Negara Sejati" or "True Nation", the name of Prince Jayakarta who first founded the Jatinegara Kaum village. This village was founded after the Dutch destroyed the Sunda Kelapa Palace and is located between Rawamangun and Klender Market.

Jatinegara station was opened on 15 October 1909 during the Dutch colonial period. It was known then as Meester Cornelis station. The station was designed by S. Snuyff, the head of the department of public work of the Indies at that time. Jatinegara station was the main station for the independent municipality of Meester Cornelis (now Jatinegara, a subdistrict of Jakarta). The station was meant to be the main connection to the east (Bandung). The town of Meester Cornelis, which is located on both sides of the Ciliwung River, has been an independent municipality since 1935. At first the station was called Rawa Bangke, a term for the swamps located nearby, which apparently also separate the Meester Cornelis NIS station and the other side of the river. Meester Cornelis BOS Station, which operated from the early days of the Batavia–Bekasi railway in 1887, is located further west and has served as the service office for some time.

The architect S. Snuyf originally intended to build a large station for trains to Bandung. The hope was that passengers from Weltevreden would choose this station over Kemayoran Station, then the main SS station, but not permanent. The takeover of the NIS line to Bogor, which was originally cancelled, but still allows for structural improvements and is still being maintained, so the plan is not being considered further. However, the requirement for a wider station is still being felt as Meester will be an important link station as the new link to Weltevreden Station and the existing line to Tanjung Priok via Pasar Senen. The expansion of the City of Batavia continues to lead directly to Meester Cornelis. This new station is planned to have the characteristics of a Dutch village, but also adapted to the tropics. It seems that the effort has paid off.

In connection with the construction of the Manggarai–Cikarang double-double track, this station was majorly renovated. The new station building with a modern minimalist futuristic architectural style was built to replace the overcapping station left by the Staatsspoorwegen. The original station building by S. Snuyf has been maintained because it has been designated as a cultural heritage by PT KAI's Architectural Design and Preservation Center Unit. However, for reasons of passenger comfort, PT KAI and the Directorate General of Railways have provided a skybridge and escalator in the new station building.

The new station building was fully operational on December 17, 2020. For safety reasons, DJKA remodeled the station a bit, such as removing the crossing area between platforms which was previously built while construction was still ongoing. The entrance to the old station building which has been serving passengers for 111 years has been moved to the north side of the new building.

Building and layout 

Initially, Jatinegara Station had seven railway lines with line 1 being a straight line towards Cikampek and line 2 being a straight line towards Manggarai plus one line connected to the locomotive depot located northwest of the station. To the north west of the station there are four railway lines that split up after the depot: one to Manggarai, the other to Pasar Senen.

The locomotive depot, which is located northwest of the station, was finally replaced by the Cipinang Locomotive Depot as of mid-2020. The locomotive depot building, which is a legacy of the Staatsspoorwegen, was demolished in October–November 2020, even though the building has the status as a cultural heritage.

The building designed by S. Snuyf was classified as a transitional style between the Indische Empire and the New Indies or modern colonial style (Nieuwe Indische Bouwstijl). The dominance of the modern colonial style can be seen from the shape of the roof which is steep but adapts to the tropical climate of the Dutch East Indies. The usage of doors, windows and clerestory functions as natural lighting and cross-ventilation in accordance with the humid tropical climate. The building is made asymmetrical, but has a focal point in the form of a building hall which is taller than the buildings on either side. However, that building has disappeared with the construction of the new station building.

After the construction of the double-double track on this station segment up to Cakung Station in 2018, there have been quite significant changes to the track layout. The number of lines at this station has increased to eight with the designation of each line depicted in the track layout diagram below. The following layout is not standard considering the existence of ad hoc changes in the field that arise from time to time, especially during overtaking, as well as changes that will come at the completion of the double-double track project.

Services
The following is a list of train services at the Jatinegara Station.

Passenger services 
 KAI Commuter
  Cikarang Loop Line (Full Racket)
  Cikarang Loop Line (Half Racket), to / (via  and ) and

Supporting transportation

Notes

References

External links

 PT KAI - the Indonesian rail company
 Forum Semboyan35 - Indonesian Rail fans Forum

East Jakarta
Railway stations in Jakarta
Railway stations opened in 1909
Colonial architecture in Jakarta